The International Association for Bear Research and Management (IBA), sometimes shortened to International Bear Association, is a professional organization for biologists, wildlife managers and others which focuses on wildlife conservation of the eight species of bear.  The organization has over 550 members in 50 countries. Its focuses are scientific management of bears; research, distribution of information, and international conferences on bear biology, ecology and management.

Conferences and publications 

The IBA hosts at least one conference in North America and at least one in Eurasia every three years.  The 2013 conference was the 22nd, and took place September 15–21, 2013, in Provo, Utah, US.  The first was held during August 1968 in Whitehorse, Yukon Territory, Canada.

The IBA partners with the Bear Specialist Group (BSG), of the World Conservation Union (IUCN) and its Species Survival Commission, to publish the quarterly newsletter International Bear News. The IBA also publishes peer-reviewed manuscripts in the scientific journal Ursus which has two issues per year.  Prior to Ursus, conference proceedings included invited papers and papers presented at  conferences published as Bears: Their Biology and Management and later International Conference on Bear Research and Management.

See also 
 Bear conservation

References

External links 
 IBA web site

Conservation and environmental foundations in the United States
Bear conservation